The 1912 Lancashire Cup  was the eighth year of this regional rugby league competition. The cup was won by Wigan who beat the holders Rochdale Hornets in the final at The Willows, Salford by a score of 21-5. The attendance at the final was 6,000 and receipts £200.

Background 
As in 1911 the 12 semi-professional clubs and Warwickshire side Coventry. With a total of entrants 13, there were three byes in the first round

Competition and Results

Round 1  
Involved  5 matches (with three byes) and 13 clubs

Round 2 – quarterfinals

Round 3 – semifinals

Final

Teams and scorers 

Scoring - Try = three (3) points - Goal = two (2) points - Drop goal = two (2) points

The road to success

See also 
1912–13 Northern Rugby Football Union season

Notes 
 1 According to the Widnes official archives the score was 36-0, but according to "RUGBY LEAGUE project" the score was 36-9
 2 The Willows was the home ground of Salford

References

RFL Lancashire Cup
Lancashire Cup